Johnny & The MoTones are an American, Wisconsin based blues group, led by the musician John Altenburgh, and licensed through Altenburgh Records and distributed by The Orchard /Sony Music Entertainment. Notable musicians who have recorded with Johnny & The MoTones include; John Altenburgh, former Curb Records recording artist Mitch Viegut, Chris O'Keefe, Ryan Korb, Bruce Lammers, Paula Hall, Otis McLennon, John Greiner, David Hood, James Lott, Mark Mattioli, Keras Rubka Nimz, Kevin Moore  and Mike Dillon, current member of the Decoys and past member of The Dickey Betts Band.

History

Beginnings 
The group was created in 2004 after jazz recording artist, John Altenburgh received an offer from Sun Studio, (Memphis, Tennessee) President, John Schorr to record for free after Altenburgh loaned antique recording equipment for display in the Sun Studio Museum. The result was the album, Two Hits For The Kitty, (The Sun Studio Sessions)

The Ultimate Road Trip
Two Hits For The Kitty spent 18 weeks in the Roots Music Report & Cashbox (magazine) Blues Charts in 2005. The album was recorded in three hours as the group did a roots "Live in the Studio" recording just like a classic session from the 1950s. Altenburgh played Jerry Lee Lewis's piano for part of the session. Jazz Review commented "(Two Hits For The Kitty) has all the energy you’d expect from a group playing in the hall of kings."  Wisconsin Public Radio's, Glen Moberg called it the "Ultimate Road Trip" as the group appeared on his show, Route 51.

The Ultimate Road Trip continued as the group followed up that release with Get Gone (The Muscle Shoals Sessions) as the group traveled to another legendary recording studio, Rick Hall's Fame Studios in Muscle Shoals, Alabama. Recorded with legendary sideman David Hood on bass. This time the group took seven hours to record their second "live in studio" album.  Get Gone spent 17 weeks on the Roots Music Report, Cashbox (magazine) and Living Blues Blues Charts in 2007.  The group's goal was to capture that Rick Hall Muscle Shoals Sound. The group spent time with the legendary producer before the session to get a feel for how they would accomplish their task, it worked!  Living Blues Magazine said; "This is swamp-rockin' Memphis soul, slightly updated but with a reverence for the old-fashioned blues-rock sound, with nasty guitars, gritty vocals, sassy original songs, and a borrowed rhythm section of David Hood and Mike Dillon Curington (from the Muscle Shoals Rhythm Section)." Wisconsin Public Radio said; "They took another road-trip and hit gold for the second time." "Get Gone" was engineered by Jimmy Nutt, whose credits include; Jimmy Buffett and The Drive By Truckers.

Studio recordings
In 2010 Johnny & The MoTones recorded Nothing To Lose. This time the group stayed in Wisconsin and did their first full production album at RiverSide Productions Recording Studio. Again the group spent significant time in the Blues Charts at Roots Music Report, Cashbox and Real Blues Magazine as well as appearing in iTunes charts for Switzerland and Norway. The track, "Maybe Baby" hit the Roadhouse & Boogie Top 40 compiled by Cashbox (magazine) and beachshag.com. Although this recording was their first full production album, the group's versatile approach to their music was not lost. The Amazon Editorial Staff remarked; "This talented group of musicians effortlessly switch gears from electric blues to traditional blues to jump blues to Rhythm and Blues and make it all work together! The Mo-Tones unmistakable sound lives on in Nothing To Lose!" The group's musicianship was also being noticed. Radio Indy commented; ".....Nothing to Lose impresses with strong vocals and a vibrant energy from the piano and excellent sax riffs while the bass and drums keep the steady beat....highlights some brilliant solo work by the guitar and horn giving the audience a taste of the fantastic caliber of musicianship. Mark Thompson of The Blues Historian wrote; "This is definitely a band with plenty of musical firepower. That may be why they explore a wide range of musical styles on this disc."

In 2012, the group was back in the studio to record the 2013 release Shake It. This album was heard on such syndicated blues shows as; Blues Deluxe, Confessing The Blues, Smokestack Lightning, The Americana Music Show (several times), The House of Blues Radio Hour with Dan Aykroyd, and Main Street Blues. It marked the first time that the group appeared in Blues and Americana Music Charts. Blues Blast magazine said, " Johnny & The MoTones come out swingin’ long and strong with their self-produced collection of soul-based swing, jump swamp and gospel blues. They want you to “Shake It,” and deliver on all counts.

Johnny & The MoTones have received international attention as Vincente Zumel Producer of La Hora Del Blues Show in SPAIN wrote: "Johnny & The MoTones come back again with an album full of electrifying rhythm and blues and soul. Gratifying in all senses, Johnny & The MoTones show a complete amazing credibility, engaging all listeners with a bunch of songs performed on an easygoing way, together with an amazing bite and an own personal style, which makes them look different from many of their music colleagues."  Again the group found its way into various blues charts, including; Roots Music Report, Cashbox (magazine), CD Baby, and iTunes. The group's musicianship was again noticed as Across The Roots Music Universe stated; "and while the vocals are great on the album, for me, it's the talent of the assembled musicians that make the album really stand-out! As you listen to the album, on some tracks it's the organ and guitar that stand out, and on others Johnny's piano playing takes center stage! But let's not forget the trumpet and drums, at times, and I even think I heard a bass solo on one track!!" When asked, in an interview conducted by the Greek writer, Michael Limnios of Greek Blues, "What is the philosophy of the MoTones?" Altenburgh stated; "I love exploring all music because there is good in every music genre. So for the MoTones, we have no set course.  It’s obviously based in the blues but R&B/Soul/Jazz and rock rhythms will always have influence on us."  Shake It marked the first time Johnny Altenburgh's son, rapper, Garret Altenburgh, worked with his dad, listed as Assistant Engineer.

The group has produced many videos and documentaries of their recordings, specifically their time at Sun Studios and Fame Studios as well as videos made from Nothin' To Lose and Shake It (Row Me Down The Muddy Mississippi), appearing worldwide on shows such as EDM America TV.  Many of their songs have been used for television documentaries and production music worldwide, including; NBC’s Poker After Dark, Comedy Central, National Public Radio’s All Things Considered, and others.

Discography

Albums
2005 Two Hits For The Kitty (The Sun Studio Sessions) Orchard/Sony
2007 Get Gone (The Muscle Shoals Sessions) Orchard/Sony
2010 Nothin' To Lose Orchard/Sony
2013 Shake It Orchard/Sony
2018 Highway 51 Orchard/Sony
2020 John Altenburgh Live Orchard/Sony

Compilation albums etc.
2008 Mark Mattioli Anthology Orchard/Sony
2009 Chris O'Keefe Anthology  Orchard/Sony
2010 John Altenburgh "The Best of"  Orchard/Sony
2011 Jazz "Jazz Rock 3"  Various Artists Audiosparx  
2011 Pop International  "Family Music 3" Various Artists  Rosenklang Records
2014 "Love Is In the Air" (Nothin' to Lose) Various Artists Happy Life Records

References

Musical groups from Wisconsin
American blues musical groups